East Newton is a hamlet in the East Riding of Yorkshire, England in an area known as Holderness. It lies to the east of the B1242 road on the North Sea coast.

East Newton forms part of the civil parish of Aldbrough.

References

External links

Villages in the East Riding of Yorkshire
Holderness
Populated coastal places in the East Riding of Yorkshire